The West Concord Public Library is a library in West Concord, Minnesota.  It is a member of Southeastern Libraries Cooperating, in the southeast Minnesota library region.

References

External links 
 GoogleMap to library
 Online Catalog
 Southeastern Libraries Cooperating

Southeastern Libraries Cooperating
Buildings and structures in Dodge County, Minnesota
Education in Dodge County, Minnesota